The 1945 West Virginia Mountaineers football team was an American football team that represented West Virginia University as an independent during the 1945 college football season. In its ninth season under head coach Ira Rodgers, the team compiled a 2–6–1 record and was outscored by a total of 126 to 122. The team played its home games at Mountaineer Field in Morgantown, West Virginia. Joe Pozego was the team captain.

Schedule

References

West Virginia
West Virginia Mountaineers football seasons
West Virginia Mountaineers football